Ryan James Clark (born 9 April 1983) is an Australian lifeguard and former television and film actor. He became known for his portrayal of Sam Marshall in Home and Away over the course of a decade, before becoming a Waverley Council lifeguard on Bondi Beach and featuring in Bondi Rescue.

Early life
Born in Sydney, New South Wales, Australia, Clark was raised in the Sydney beachside suburb of Bronte. He was a member of Bronte Surf Club as a child.

Acting career
Clark is best known for his role as Sam Marshall in the soap opera Home and Away. He joined the cast of Home and Away when he was seven years old. He departed the show in 2001, but returned for two guest appearances in 2002 and 2005. He appeared as an Australian surfer in the 2000 direct-to-video film Our Lips Are Sealed, featuring the Olsen Twins. In 2003, he made a guest appearance in an episode of White Collar Blue, and in 2008, he played a minor role in the Australian film The Black Balloon.

Bondi lifeguard

In 2003, Clark began working as a Waverley Council lifeguard on Bondi Beach, and since 2006, has featured in the factual television programme Bondi Rescue. As a lifeguard, he is better known by his nickname "Whippet".

Filmography

Personal life
Clark and his wife Gina Brackenridge have three children.

References

External links
 
 Ryan Clark at tenplay.com.au

1983 births
Male actors from Sydney
Australian male film actors
Australian male child actors
Australian male soap opera actors
Living people
People from the Eastern Suburbs (Sydney)
Australian surf lifesavers